"Enjoy Yourself" is a song by American rapper A+, released as the only single from his second studio album, Hempstead High (1999). It samples the 1976 Walter Murphy song "A Fifth of Beethoven". Released in October 1998, the song reached the top five of the UK Singles Chart and number 63 on the US Billboard Hot 100. It was also commercially successful in several European countries and Japan.

Charts

Weekly charts

Year-end charts

Release history

References

1998 singles
1998 songs
A+ (rapper) songs
Songs written by Walter Murphy
Universal Records singles